The Glennville Sentinel is the weekly newspaper that serves Glennville, Georgia. It publishes on Thursday with a circulation of about 4,500. Pamela S. Waters serves as both editor and publisher. She owns the paper with her husband, Terry.  It is also archived in the University of Georgia.

External links
 Glennville Sentinel website
 University of Georgia Libraries

Newspapers published in Georgia (U.S. state)
Tattnall County, Georgia